The genus Aellopos consists of large day-flying moths in the family Sphingidae. It was first described by Jacob Hübner in 1819. Species in this genus occur from Maine in the United States through Central America and down to Argentina and Uruguay in South America.

Species
Aellopos blaini (Herrich-Schaffer, 1869)
Aellopos ceculus (Cramer, 1777)
Aellopos clavipes (Rothschild & Jordan, 1903) – clavipes sphinx moth
Aellopos fadus (Cramer, 1775) – Fadus sphinx moth
Aellopos tantalus (Linnaeus, 1758) – Tantalus sphinx moth
Aellopos titan (Cramer, 1777) – Titan sphinx moth

References

 
Dilophonotini
Taxa named by Jacob Hübner
Moth genera